Charles Luckyth Roberts (August 7, 1887 – February 5, 1968), better known as Luckey Roberts, was an American composer and stride pianist who worked in the jazz, ragtime, and blues styles.

Biography
Luckey Roberts was born in Philadelphia, Pennsylvania, United States, and was playing piano and acting professionally with traveling Negro minstrel shows in his childhood. He settled in New York City about 1910 and became one of the leading pianists in Harlem, and started publishing some of his original rags.

Roberts toured France and the UK with James Reese Europe during World War I, then returned to New York where he wrote music for various shows and recorded piano rolls.

With James P. Johnson, Roberts developed the stride piano style of playing about 1919. Roberts' reach on the keyboard was unusually large (he could reach a fourteenth), leading to a rumor that he had the webbing between his fingers surgically cut, which those who knew him and saw him play live denounce as false; Roberts simply had naturally large hands with wide finger spread.

In the 1920s, Roberts teamed up with lyricist Alex C. Rogers and co-wrote three Broadway musicals, Go-Go (1923), Sharlee (1923) and My Magnolia (1926), the later which starred Adelaide Hall, a major black revue star.

Luckey Roberts noted compositions include "Junk Man Rag", "Moonlight Cocktail", "Pork and Beans", and "Railroad Blues". "Moonlight Cocktail" was recorded by the Glenn Miller Orchestra, and was the best selling record in the United States for ten weeks in 1942.

An astute businessman, Roberts became a millionaire twice through real estate dealings. He died in New York City and is buried at the Frederick Douglass Memorial Gardens in Bay Terrace, Staten Island, New York.

See also
List of ragtime composers

References

Bibliography

 Scivales Riccardo (ed.), Harlem Stride Piano Solos, Katonah, New York, Ekay Music, 1990.

External links

1887 births
1968 deaths
African-American jazz composers
African-American jazz pianists
American blues pianists
American male pianists
Blackface minstrel performers
Musicians from Philadelphia
Ragtime composers
Ragtime pianists
Stride pianists
Jazz musicians from Pennsylvania
American male jazz composers
American jazz composers
20th-century American pianists
20th-century African-American male singers